Albertville is a city in Wright County, Minnesota, United States. The City is a Northwest suburb of the Minneapolis- St Paul “Twin Cities” metropolitan area. The population was 7,896 at the 2020 census.

History
The area that is known as Albertville was first a town site called "Hamburg" by Joseph Vetsch. Later that same year in August, the Minneapolis and Northwestern Railroad Company bought land for a railroad through the area (now the BNSF rail in downtown Albertville). After 30 years of contributions to the area, including Albert Zachman, who donated land for the current historic church by Central Park (also recognized as Lions Park) J.P. Eull and Theodore Aydt proposed a petition to incorporate the township as Saint Michael Station with a population of 190. The first election held, to construct a village hall, happened in 1903. It passed on a vote of 20-18 with a cost of $531.95 ($4,035.03 today). In the next few years, the town started to raise funds for a Catholic Church, completed in 1902, was named the Church of St. Albert, in honor of Albert Zachman's contributions to the town. In 1909, Father Duhr proposed to change the name to Albertville in 1909, again in honor of Albert Zachman. The town approved, but was not official until September 1919, making the name change official.

Geography
Albertville is generally considered the halfway point between Minneapolis and Saint Cloud.

Albertville is home to the Albertville Premium Outlets, One of 2 outlet centers in the Twin Cities, the other being located in Eagan Minnesota.

The city contains the Church of St Albert, constructed in 1902.

Infrastructure

Transportation
Interstate 94/US Highway 52 serves as a main route in the city. Wright County Roads 18, 19, 37, 137 and newly added County Road 38 on the border between Otsego and Albertville, MN are other routes within the city.

Economy
Albertville is the home of Albertville Premium Outlets, an outlet mall which houses 100 stores.

Education
Albertville is part of St. Michael–Albertville Independent School District 885.

Government and Politics
Albertville's city council contains five council members, including the city's mayor, who serves a two-year term. As of February 2020, the current mayor of Albertville is Jillian Hendrickson.

Demographics

2010 census
As of the census of 2010, there were 7,044 people, 2,377 households, and 1,799 families living in the city. The racial makeup of the city was 91.6% White, 2.5% African American, 0.3% Native American, 3.0% Asian, 0.6% from other races, and 2.0% from two or more races. Hispanic or Latino of any race were 2.8% of the population.

There were 2,377 households, of which 50.9% had children under the age of 18 living with them, 62.2% were married couples living together, 8.7% had a female householder with no husband present, 4.8% had a male householder with no wife present, and 24.3% were non-families. 18.1% of all households were made up of individuals, and 3.9% had someone living alone who was 65 years of age or older. The average household size was 2.96 and the average family size was 3.41.

The median age in the city was 30.9 years. 34.4% of residents were under the age of 18; 6.4% were between the ages of 18 and 24; 36.6% were from 25 to 44; 17.3% were from 45 to 64; and 5.3% were 65 years of age or older. The gender makeup of the city was 49.6% male and 50.4% female.

2000 census
As of the census of 2000, there were 3,621 people, 1,287 households, and 984 families living in the city. The racial makeup of the city was 98.51% White, 0.30% African American, 0.22% Native American, 0.25% Asian, 0.08% from other races, and 0.64% from two or more races. Hispanic or Latino of any race were 0.66% of the population. 44.9% were of German, 11.8% Norwegian, 8.1% Swedish and 5.1% Irish ancestry according to Census 2000.

There were 1,287 households, out of which 49.1% had children under the age of 18 living with them, 61.4% were married couples living together, 10.7% had a female householder with no husband present, and 23.5% were non-families. 16.9% of all households were made up of individuals, and 2.8% had someone living alone who was 65 years of age or older. The average household size was 2.81 and the average family size was 3.21.

In the city, the population was spread out, with 34.1% under the age of 18, 8.5% from 18 to 24, 41.5% from 25 to 44, 10.8% from 45 to 64, and 5.1% who were 65 years of age or older. The median age was 29 years. For every 100 females, there were 101.4 males. For every 100 females age 18 and over, there were 102.1 males.

The median income for a household in the city was $58,260, and the median income for a family was $63,578. Males had a median income of $41,783 versus $30,244 for females. The per capita income for the city was $21,424. About 6.7% of families and 6.9% of the population were below the poverty line, including 9.9% of those under age 18 and none of those age 65 or over.

References

External links
 Albertville official website
 St. Michael–Albertville Independent School District #885
 ePodunk: Profile for Albertville, Minnesota

Cities in Minnesota
Cities in Wright County, Minnesota